Ingrid Johansen Aune (Stavanger, October 19, 1985 – Namsos, August 1, 2019) was a Norwegian politician who was mayor of the city of Malvik from 2015 until her death.

Life
Aune was born in 1985 in Stavanger. She earned a degree in International Relations and Economics from the University of Oslo in 2010, later completing her studies at the University of Wisconsin-Madison. She was a member of the Labour Party and she had been a political adviser whilst Jens Stoltenberg was Prime Minister.

On May 15, 2012, she became political adviser to Minister of State Espen Barth Eide and part of the leadership of the Ministry of Defense. She moved on to a similar position in the Ministry of Foreign Affairs in September.

She and her partner Eivind Olav Kjelbotn Evensen died on August 1, 2019 after a boat accident on the outskirts of Namsos. She was 33 years old. She had been flown to Namsos Hospital but died after her arrival.

References 

1985 births
2019 deaths
Politicians from Stavanger
Norwegian women in politics
University of Oslo alumni
University of Wisconsin–Madison alumni